Nadnarwianka Pułtusk is a Polish football club based in Pułtusk. As of 2021–22, they compete in the regional league, Ciechanów-Ostrołęka group.

In the years 2006-2010 the club played in the third league.

References 

Association football clubs established in 1921
1921 establishments in Poland
Pułtusk County
Football clubs in Masovian Voivodeship